Yanlan Mao is a British biologist who is a professor at University College London. Her research considers cell biology and the molecular mechanism that underpin tissue formation. She was awarded the Royal Microscopical Society Medal for Life Sciences in 2021.

Early life 
Mao's father was a mathematician, and she spent her childhood at academic conferences. She considered pursuing a career as a mathematician, but then realised the beauty of biology. In particular, she was fascinated by patterns in nature. She studied natural sciences at the University of Cambridge. She earned her doctorate at the Medical Research Council Institute in Cambridge. Her doctoral research considered drosophila cell signalling and epithelial patterning. Mao joined Cancer Research UK as a postdoctoral research fellow, where she became interested in tissue mechanics and the role of mechnical forces in cell division. During her postdoc she became more interested in physical modelling.

Research and career 
In 2014, Mao launched her own independent laboratory at University College London. Her research focusses on how tissues achieve their appropriate size and three-dimensional architecture. It was previously unclear how the mechanical properties of cells influence the formation of organs. She makes use of Drosophila genetics and computational modelling to understand the mechanisms that underpin tissue growth.

Awards and honours 
 2018 L’Oréal UNESCO Women in Science Fellowship
 2018 Lister Institute Research Prize
 2019 EMBO Young Investigator Programme
 2019 Biophysical Society Early Career Award in Mechanobiology 
 2020 BSCB Women in Cell Biology Early Career Medal
 2021 Royal Microscopical Society Medal for Life Sciences  
 2022 MRC Senior Non-Clinical Fellowship

Selected publications

References 

Living people
Alumni of the University of Cambridge
Academics of University College London
21st-century British biologists
British women biologists
Cell biologists
Year of birth missing (living people)